Chicago Society of Etchers was founded in January 1910, the first organization of etchers in the country. There were 20 members to start and by 1930 there were 150 members. Membership extended outside of the United States, including artists from England, France, Italy, Germany, Sweden, India, China and Japan.

History
In 1909, to popularize the medium of etching, Bertha Jaques and other etchers in Chicago formed the Needle Club, an informal collective of etchers passionate about reintroducing the American public to the art of etching. In 1910 it became the Chicago Society of Etchers. The organization was primarily responsible for showing members’ etchings at the Art Institute of Chicago. It attracted international members and was successful at popularizing etching in 20th-century America. Society members pooled funds for annual prizes for new prints, to be gifted to the Art Institute, and tithed ten percent of their dues to the museum for new print acquisitions. The group disbanded in 1956.

Members
 Benjamin Brown
 Cleo Damianakes
 Mukul Dey
 Frances Farrand Dodge
 Norah Hamilton 
 Bertha Jaques, founding member
 Troy Kinney
 Pedro Joseph de Lemos, affiliate member
 Beatrice S. Levy
 Louis Conrad Rosenberg
 Wallace Leroy DeWolf
 Bror Julius Olsson Nordfeldt

See also
 American print clubs

References

Further reading
 Book review of Jaques and the Chicago Society of Etchers
 Chicago Society of Etchers records, 1933-1972, (bulk 1940-1959)

American etchers
American artist groups and collectives
Arts organizations based in Illinois
Arts organizations established in 1910
1910 establishments in Illinois